Henopause, a portmanteau of "hen" and "menopause", is sometimes used to refer to the point at which hens stop laying eggs.

Description
Although daily egg production starts to tail off after one year old, it may continue until 5–7 years old. Older hens gradually produce fewer eggs, and the eggs are usually larger. Since the average lifespan of a pet layer hen is 8–15 years, henopause has received attention as a potential problem for backyard or urban chicken farmers who are eventually faced with the decision to either slaughter older layers or keep them as non-producing pets. In the UK, the British Hen Welfare Trust charity rescues commercial hens who would otherwise be sent to slaughter when they become no longer commercially viable.

Complications in keeping an affected hen
In commercial farming, a layer hen is considered no longer commercially viable at around thirteen months and is called a "spent hen".

See also
Forced molting

References

Chickens
Eggs (food)
Egg farming
Menopause
Poultry farming